Canoas Futebol Clube, also known simply as Canoas is a football team of Canoas, Rio Grande do Sul, Brazil. Its mascot is a lion.

External links
 Canoas Futebol Clube at Arquivo de Clubes

Association football clubs established in 1957
Football clubs in Rio Grande do Sul
1957 establishments in Brazil
Canoas